Smail Tulja (born Smajo Džurlić; 1940 or 1941 in Plav, Montenegro, Yugoslavia) is a Montenegrin who was convicted in a Montenegro court, in July 2010, for the 1990 murder of Mary Beal in New York City. Beal went missing on September 15, 1990 and was found three weeks later in two garbage bags. She had been decapitated and dismembered.

Džurlić changed his name to Tulja after fleeing the U.S., with his third wife, following Beal's murder.

Tulja/Džurlić is suspected of being the "Butcher of Mons", in the mid-1990s. He had fled to the Belgian city, still with  his third wife, sometime after the murder of Mary Beal. The female victims in Belgium share the similarity of being found dismembered and in garbage bags scattered across the city. Two dismembered female murder victims were found in Albania in 2006.  Albanian police asked the American Embassy Regional Security Office for assistance, who coordinated with the FBI resulting in a chain of events that did not solve the Albanian deaths, but did link NYPD to the FBI investigation and Tulja/Džurlić's 2007 arrest in Montenegro by local authorities.  That country had just declared independence in 2006, and did not yet have an extradition treaty with the U.S.  The Montenegrin court system tried him for Beal's murder in New York City, convicting him in June 2010 and sending him to jail for 12 years a few weeks later.

The FBI/NYPD believe that Tulja/Džurlić may have committed at least eight total murders in Belgium (five), Albania (two) and America (Beal), though Belgian and Albanian police have not made any conclusive connections to those murders.

References

External links
ABC News: Suspect in NYC Slaying Arrested Abroad
AOL News: Suspected serial killer arrested in Montenegro
International Herald Tribune: Tip from New York City police detective leads to arrest of suspected serial killer in Europe

1940s births
Living people
Montenegrin emigrants to the United States
Montenegrin Muslims
Montenegrin people convicted of murder
People convicted of murder by Montenegro
People from Plav, Montenegro
Suspected serial killers